Simon Brattel is a British hardware and software designer.

Career
He founded Design Design in 1976  as a company name to use on various hardware designs, mainly in the audio field.

When at Crystal Computing he was part of the team that produced the ZX Spectrum game Halls of the Things and the Z80 assembler Zeus. Much of the development was done using homebrew computers.

References

British electronics engineers
British computer programmers
Living people
Year of birth missing (living people)